The Mamaku Ranges are a mountain range in the North Island of New Zealand. Located to the west of Lake Rotorua and north of Lake Taupō, they lie to the immediate south of the Kaimai Range and can be thought of as an extension of it, in much the same way that the Kaimai Range can be considered an extension of the Coromandel Range.  The hills terminate in the south with the valley of the Waikato River. There were at one time numerous bush railways that ran over and through the Ranges. One disused line has been developed for tourism.

The range is extensively forested, with the Kaimai-Mamaku State Forest and Kinleith Forest both covering a considerable part of them. The forest includes kauri trees growing at the far southern limit of their natural range. Some Kauri can be accessed via the Rapurapu Kauri Track.

References 

Landforms of the Bay of Plenty Region
Mountain ranges of New Zealand
South Waikato District